The Python Project is a 1967 spy thriller novel by the British Victor Canning. It is the third in a series of four novels about Rex Carver, a private detective drawn back into his old profession of espionage. A complex plot which involves a jewel robbery and the exchange of prisoners between the British and Soviet intelligence services takes place in a variety of locations including London, Paris, Libya and the Balearic Islands.

References

Bibliography
 Burton, Alan. Historical Dictionary of British Spy Fiction. Rowman & Littlefield, 2016.
Murphy, Bruce F. The Encyclopedia of Murder and Mystery. Springer, 1999.
 Reilly, John M. Twentieth Century Crime & Mystery Writers. Springer, 2015.

1967 British novels
British spy novels
British thriller novels
Novels by Victor Canning
Novels set in London
Novels set in Italy
Novels set in Paris
Novels set in Libya
Heinemann (publisher) books